Deep Dhillon is an Indian actor who works in Hindi and Punjabi cinema. He played the role of Jayadratha in the famous Indian TV serial Mahabharat and appeared as Sahasrarjun in the TV serial Vishnu Puran. He is known for playing Inspector Sharma in Ghayal opposite Sunny Deol, and as the notorious truck driver in Maine Pyaar Kiya. He Is Also Known For Playing Dadaji In Star Plus’s Hit Serial Ek Hazaaron Mein Meri Behna Hai. He is famous for his baritone voice as well as many villain characters in television and movies.

Early life and career
He was born in a Jat Sikh family. He originally hails from the town, Patti in Tarn Taran District of Punjab. His son Kanwar Dhillon is also a television actor, who is based in Mumbai.

Filmography

Films

1985 Aaj Ka Daur
1985 Karishma Kudrat Kaa as Dacait Shera
1987 Mirch Masala as Soldier/Guard of Subhedar
 1987 Hukumat
 1987 Mr. India as Garga (Goon & Casino Club Owner) 
1987 Mard Ki Zabaan as Local Goon
 1988 Jatt Soormay+
 1988 Shukriyaa as Guru, College Student
 1988 Waaris
 1988 Bloodstone
 1989 Mahaadev as Heera Goon
 1989 Vardi
 1989 Joshilaay
 1989 Ladaai as Robert
 1989 Maine Pyar Kiya as Lal Miyaan
 1990 Qurbani Jatt Di
 1990 Ghayal as Corrupt Police Officer Pritam Sharma
 1991 Vaisakhi
 1991 Patthar Ke Phool as Ram Singh Gupti
 1992 Saali Aadhi Gharwali
 1992 Jatt Punjab Da
 1992 Kal Ki Aawaz
 1992 Yalgaar as Jagtiani
 1992 Jatt Punjab Daa
 1992 Humshakal as Police Inspector Chaudhary
 1993 Aaj Kie Aurat as Mangal Singh / Daku Bhairav Singh
 1993 Krishan Avtaar as Pasha
 1993 Anmol as Pasha Henchman
 1993 Pehchaan as Police Inspector
 1993 Shatranj as William
 1994 Pathreela Raasta as Jagraal
 1994 Cheetah as Police Inspector Gupta
 1994 Chauraha  as Girdhari
 1995 Taaqat as Irfan
 1995 Rani Hindustani
 1995 Karmon Kee Sazaa as Chaudhary Goon
 1995 Faisala Main Karungi
 1996 Vijeta as Satyamurti
 1996 Vishwasghaat as Police Inspector Inamdar
 1996 Loafer as Tatya
 1996 Krishna as Sharpshooter / Hitman Who killed the Minister
 1996 Ghatak: Lethal as Antya
 1996 Lalchee
 1998 Dildara
 1999 Dulhan Banoo Main Teri
 1991 Zulmi as Bakhtawar/Chhotey
 1999 A.K.47
 2000 Shikari
 2001 Yeh Raaste Hain Pyaar Ke as Bhanwarlal
 2002 Jee Aayan Nu(Punjabi Movie)
 2003 The Hero: Love Story of a Spy as Pak Colonel Hidayatullah
 2003 Qayamat - City Under Threat as Pak Brigadier Raashid
 2004 Asa Nu Maan Watna Da
 2004 Hulchul as Pratap 
 2006 Ek Jind Ek Jaan
 2006 Mannat
 2006 Anokhe Amar Shaheed Baba Deep Singh Ji
 2006 Aatma
 2006 Dil Apna Punjabi
 2007 Mitti Wajaan Maardi
 2008 Mera Pind
 2008 Mr Black Mr White
 2009 Munde U.K. De
 2010 Sadiyaan as Imran Noor Ahmed
 2010 Chhevan Dariya (The Sixth River) 
 2011 The Lion of Punjab
 2011 Jihne Mera Dil Luteya
 2011 Khushiyaan
 2012 Rehmataan
 2012 Gal Sun Ho Gaya
 2012 Ajj De Ranjhe
 2012 Mitro - Mitro
 2014 Little Terrors
 2014 Fateh

Television
1987  ((Chunni )) Episode 11 guest appearance in Gurdas Maan song 'ni main kamli'
 1988–1990 Mahabharat as Jayadratha
 1993 Kanoon as Karan Jaswal
 1993-98 Zee Horror Show as Different roles
 1994 Junoon 1994 Ajnabi as Passa
 1998 Beta 1997 Betaal Pachisi as Jakali
 1997 Jai Hanuman as Dashratha
 1998 Main Dilli Hoon as Jaichand
 1999–2000 Gul Sanobar as Zargam
 2002 Aryamaan – Brahmaand Ka Yodha as King Durdan
 2004 Jai Maa Durga as Mahishasur
 2003 Vishnu Puran as Sahastrabahu
 1994 Joshiley 2007 Jai Maa Durga as Mahishasur
 2011-2013 Ek Hazaaron Mein Meri Behna Hai'' as Dadaji

References

External links
 

Indian male film actors
Indian Sikhs
Punjabi people
Male actors in Hindi cinema
Living people
Male actors in Punjabi cinema
20th-century Indian male actors
21st-century Indian male actors
Place of birth missing (living people)
1956 births